David Perry (born 4 April 1967) is a Northern Irish video game developer and programmer. He became prominent for programming platform games for 16-bit home consoles in the early to mid 1990s, including Disney's Aladdin, Cool Spot, and Earthworm Jim. He founded Shiny Entertainment, where he worked from 1993 to 2006. Perry created games for companies such as Disney, 7 Up, McDonald's, Hemdale, and Warner Bros. In 2008 he was presented with an honorary doctorate from Queen's University Belfast for his services to computer gaming. He was the co-founder & CEO of cloud-based games service Gaikai, which was acquired by Sony Computer Entertainment. In 2017 Perry became the co-founder & CEO of a customer intelligence startup called GoVYRL, Inc. developing a new advanced brand dashboard called Carro.

Biography

Perry was born in April 1967 in Lisburn, Northern Ireland, growing up in the towns of Templepatrick and Donegore in County Antrim, attending Templepatrick Primary School and then Methodist College Belfast.

He began writing computer game programming books in 1982 at the age of 15, creating his own games for the Sinclair ZX81. In an interview with the BBC, Perry stated that his first game was a driving game, "a black blob avoiding other black blobs", which he wrote and sent to a magazine, which printed it. He sent them more games and they sent him a cheque for £450: a bit of a problem for a teenager who did not yet have a bank account. His work continued until he was offered a job for £3,500/year as an apprentice to a veteran programmer who taught him more advanced programming.

At the age of 17, he moved to London, where he developed games with Mikro-Gen and Probe Software for publishers such as Elite Systems and Mirrorsoft, working on titles such as the ZX Spectrum conversion of Teenage Mutant Ninja Turtles for NES and the Sega Genesis version of The Terminator.

In 1991, he moved to the United States to work for the American division of Virgin Games, usually known as Virgin Games USA. While in there, he led the development duties for several award-winning games for the Genesis, including Global Gladiators, Cool Spot, and Aladdin. His work within Virgin Games USA also served as a basis for the development of other games such as the Sega CD version of The Terminator and the Genesis versions of RoboCop Versus The Terminator and Walt Disney's The Jungle Book, all of them developed after David Perry had left the studio.

On 1 October 1993, Perry formed his own company in Laguna Beach, California, Shiny Entertainment, naming the company after the song "Shiny Happy People" by R.E.M. The company's first game Earthworm Jim was a hit, selling millions of copies on multiple platforms, including Sega Genesis, Super NES and PC. The title character, an "average worm" who stumbles upon a space suit which turns him into a superhero, became immensely popular, and spawned a variety of other types of merchandise: action figures, comic books, and a syndicated television cartoon series.

Listing Perry in their "75 Most Important People in the Games Industry of 1995", Next Generation argued that his success had as much to do with his exceptional knack for public relations as his talent as a developer: "Perry often seems to benefit and suffer from a game press who seemingly can't hype him or his products enough. Is all the hype justified? Well, probably not. But that's not the point, the fact is that the press and gamers love him. Next Generations opinion as to Perry's PR secrets? Always return phone calls, don't make promises you can't keep, and show a genuine interest in whomever you're talking to. Sounds easy? So how come hardly any actual PR people (let alone presidents and lead programmers) in the industry do the same?"

In 2002, Shiny Entertainment was acquired by Atari, Inc. for US$47 million, with Perry signed to a long-term contract to continue on as president. Also in 2002, Perry collaborated with The Wachowskis on games in coordination with their Matrix series of movies.

In 2006, he resigned from Shiny, and  formed GameConsultants.com, a consultancy firm planning to offer executive level video game industry advice, followed by GameInvestors.com, a business-to-business company to help video game development teams get funded. He recounted, "I was working on a new game design for Infogrames (Atari) called Plague and was incredibly excited about it. Atari called and told me they had run out of money, and so I offered to find a buyer for my team, they said they’d handle it and I moved on. The first phone call I had after leaving was with the Collective, and they ended up buying Shiny."

Perry is on the advisory board for the Game Developers Conference, and has spoken at industry venues such as E3, CES, Hollywood and Games, Digital Hollywood, iHollywood, SIGGRAPH, Entertainment in the Interactive Age, What Teens Want, The Banff Summit, as well as at major universities such as USC, and MIT. In 2006, he co-hosted the annual Game Developers Choice Awards with Tommy Tallarico.

In November 2008, Perry co-founded Gaikai in the Netherlands, a company that released game streaming technology in late 2009.

In January 2016, Perry confirmed that he and Michael Jackson had been discussing making a video game together prior to the singer's death.

In July 2012 Gaikai was sold to Sony Computer Entertainment for $380 million.

In July 2017 Perry left Gaikai, joining startup GoVYRL, Inc. to build new technology for brands to work with influencers; the technology is called Carro. GoVYRL, Inc. has seed investments from entities including The Cove Fund, Brendan Iribe and Alpha Edison.

Games

Books 
 David Perry on Game Design. Delmar, 2009.

References

Further reading 

 
 
 Smart computing, "The Emerald Isle’s ‘Shiny,’ Happy Game Developer", October 2000 
 Gamedev.net Interview
 Eurogamer.net Interview
 Disposable Media Interview, part 1
 Disposable Media Interview, part 2
 Queens Honorary Doctorate Press Release

External links 

 
 
 
 
 Perry is the CEO of GoVYRL, Inc. - Creator of Carro
 Perry is the CEO of GoVYRL, Inc. - Creator of TheInfluencerNews
 Perry's Personal Photography Site
 

1967 births
Living people
British video game designers
Inventors from Northern Ireland
People from Newport Beach, California
People from Lisburn
People educated at Methodist College Belfast
Video game developers
21st-century British inventors